Restless Blood (Finnish: Levoton veri) is a 1946 Finnish drama film directed by Teuvo Tulio and starring Regina Linnanheimo, Eino Katajavuori and Toini Vartiainen. The film tells the story of siblings Sylvi and Outi, who love the same man, Sylvi’s husband Valter. The couple's relationship breaks down after the tragic death of their child. After becoming blind, Sylvi suspects Valter is being unfaithful to her. She begins spying on her husband and sister Outi, and gradually her mental health deteriorates with fatal consequences.

The film was shot in parallel with the Swedish-language version Oroligt blod.

Tulio remade the film in 1953 as Jealousy.

Cast
 Regina Linnanheimo as Sylvi  
 Eino Katajavuori as Valter Sora  
 Toini Vartiainen as Outi Kahra 
 H. Stenroos as Liisa   
 Lauri Korpela as Brauner 
 Laina Laine as Housekeeper  
 Nora Mäkinen as Prostitute  
 Lida Salin as Bar hostess 
 Emma Väänänen as Mother in consulting room  
 Elli Ylimaa as Aunt

References

Bibliography 
 Pietari Kääpä. Directory of World Cinema: Finland. Intellect Books, 2012.

External links 
 

1946 films
1946 drama films
Finnish drama films
1940s Finnish-language films
Films directed by Teuvo Tulio
Finnish black-and-white films